Raduaa is an Indian Punjabi science fiction film directed by and starring Nav Bajwa with Gurpreet Ghuggi and Satinder Satti. The film's plot is based upon how a scientific experiment unexpectedly results in time travel from the present day to 1955. The film released on 11 May 2018.

Plot
It is a comedy science fiction movie where four people who are living in 2018 travel back in time to 1955. Nav (Nav Bajwa) who is IT expert, Sukhi (Gurpreet Ghuggi) who is a mechanic and Hem Chand Lamba (B.N. Sharma) who is lab technician are living as tenants in Chandigarh. Their landlady is Jasmeen (Satinder Satti). Gurpreet Ghuggi and B.N. Sharma are not paying rent regularly due to which she warns them either to pay rent or vacate. Whereas Nav Bajwa has invented a machine whom he calls Raduaa. He is earning money with this. Gurpreet Ghuggi is having strained relations with his wife who had high dreams and she leaves Gurpreet Ghuggi along with her son and asks him to pay 15 lacs if he want to meet his son. Gurpreet Ghuggi tries to steal money but is caught. Then Nav Bajwa and B.N. Sharma try to help him by intercepting a call of drug dealers through his Raduaa. These three impersonates as drug dealers and went to an agreed location for deal but the police comes on the spot and the three of them are caught. But when the police finds that they are not carrying drugs then they are released. Nav Bajwa thinks that someone is hearing their calls and think that Raduaa is not working properly. When they are trying to repair then Satinder Satti comes and due to commotion B.N. Sharma accidentally throws the beaker containing some green chemical and then there are electric shocks and all the four travel back to 1955 where they appear in a village. The villagers look them with suspicion. They Sarpanch of village give them refuge where they work together to get back to 2018. Will they succeed in returning or something more mysterious is in wait is to be seen.

Cast
Nav Bajwa
Vaibhavi joshi
Gurpreet Ghuggi
Satinder Satti
B.N. Sharma
Mahaveer Bhuller
Gurpreet Bhangu

References

External links 
 

2018 films
Punjabi-language Indian films
2010s Punjabi-language films
Indian science fiction films
2018 science fiction films